Only When We're Naked is the debut studio album by Moroccan-English musician Zak Abel. It was released on 6 October 2017 through Atlantic Records. The album includes the singles "Unstable", "Rock Bottom", "All I Ever Do (Is Say Goodbye)", "Only When We're Naked", and "The River".

Background
Talking about the album, Abel said: "I'm really into African sounds. I have been for the last 2 years. The album is basically a compilation of songs that I felt were me at my most vulnerable and most honest as I was writing them. I'd say my general sound is very soul pop and funk but the album has quite a lot of African influences too. I wanted to try some of that out."

Track listing

Charts

Release history

References

2017 debut albums
Atlantic Records albums